Chikhali is a village in Ambegaon taluka of Pune District in the state of Maharashtra, India. The village is administrated by a Sarpanch who is an elected representative of village as per constitution of India and Panchayati raj (India).
Politician = Late.Datta Kaka Sane.
He was the person know for the development of chikhali and was always there for the people in his and surrounded area 24*7 with new concept and enthusiasm for public welfare and happiness. Who ever needed his help he and his supporters were upto mark to resolve the problems without any political pressure just because of his clean attitude because he believed in public serving as his Dharma. During COVID19 he help every poor family from his own pocket all the grains from his own farm and his supporters donation just to rescue the poor people in his and connected area. Chikhali is  connected to industrial area of PCMC so all the labour from industrial sector, construction sector, government cleaning staff he took care and help them out in all the ways like ration, daily essential, financial help, sanitation of his entire area some other activities like helping them to reach there natives with his such braveness chikhalikar lost the great man Late.Datta Kaka Sane by serving his people in year 2020 during COVID19 pandemic crisis and till today the chikhalikar known it as a black day for chikhali. Now his son Mr Yash Datta sane a young person is fulfilling his father's dream and his vision by taking it to each and every corner of Chikhali by communicating with every single supporters of his father not just because of election moto but just because of the value of his father to feel that he is still there in every person whom his father had help and made them like his father Late. Datta Kaka Sane. Great person from Chikhali, Pune Maharashtra who was the panduranga and vethala for Chikhalikar.

http://ssepune.in/

http://www.balsonsheavylift.com/

References

links
  Villages in pune maharashtra

Villages in Pune district